General elections were held in Republika Srpska on 7 October 2018 as part of the Bosnian general elections. Voters elected the President of Republika Srpska and the 83 members of the National Assembly of Republika Srpska. Incumbent President Milorad Dodik was ineligible for re-election.

Incumbent Prime Minister Željka Cvijanović was nominated by the Alliance of Independent Social Democrats (SNSD) and was elected President, running on a joint platform with the Democratic People's Alliance and Socialist Party. The SNSD also remained the largest in the National Assembly, and Radovan Višković became Prime Minister after a brief interim.

Results

President

National Assembly

See also
2018 Bosnian general election
2018 Federation of Bosnia and Herzegovina general election

References

Republika Srpska
2018 in Bosnia and Herzegovina
Elections in Republika Srpska